Louise Celia "Lulu" Fleming (January 28, 1862 – June 20, 1899) was a medical doctor and one of the first African-Americans to graduate from the Women's Medical College of Pennsylvania. She returned from Africa to improve her skills and she was the first African-American woman to be commissioned for work in Africa by the Woman's American Baptist Foreign Missionary Society.

Biography
Fleming was born on January 28, 1862 to enslaved parents on Col. Lewis Michael Fleming's Hibernia Plantation in Hibernia, Clay County, Florida. Though they were enslaved, Louise Fleming's parents had unique backgrounds; her mother being half Congo and her father being half white. When Fleming was young in age, her father left to fight against slavery in the Union Army, but was released by death after two years of service. 

In December of 1877, Fleming converted to Christianity at age 15 at the Bethel Baptist Institutional Church in Jacksonville; following in the footsteps of the Lord and doing his work of spreading the Gospel from this time forward. She attended and graduated from Shaw University, as valedictorian, on May 27,1885. Fleming became a public school teacher in Saint Augustine, Florida.

In 1886 the Woman’s Baptist Foreign Mission Society of the West invited Fleming to become their missionary representative to the Congo. She accepted the invitation and arrived in the Congo in 1887, stationed at Palabala. She worked in the Congo with girls, teaching Sunday school, primary classes and English classes. Fleming returned to the United States in 1891 in order to regain her health.

With the idea of alleviating illness in the Congo, she enrolled in the Women's Medical College (WMCP) in Philadelphia in 1891. The WMCP was the first medical college established for the education of women to become doctors; defying social norms and allowing women the opportunity to obtain high levels of education. By 1925, eighteen African American women had graduated from WMCP; one of which was Louise Fleming who graduated in 1895.

Fleming returned to her mission in the Congo, becoming the only African-American woman doctor in the country. In 1898, she contracted African trypanosomiasis and returned to the United States. Fleming died on June 20, 1899 at the Samaritan Hospital in Philadelphia at the age of 37.

References

1862 births
1899 deaths
19th-century American slaves
Shaw University alumni
Woman's Medical College of Pennsylvania alumni
People from Clay County, Florida
Baptist missionaries from the United States
African-American missionaries
19th-century American women physicians
19th-century American physicians
Baptist missionaries in the Democratic Republic of the Congo
American expatriates in the Democratic Republic of the Congo
Female Christian missionaries
19th-century African-American women